The Central Rail Line (CMK, also designated by PKP Polskie Linie Kolejowe as Rail Line No. 4, Polish: Linia kolejowa nr 4), was completed on 23 December 1977. The line goes from the city of Zawiercie in Zagłębie Dąbrowskie region of southern Poland, to Grodzisk Mazowiecki in the suburbs of Warsaw. The line was originally built for rail freight transport, but it now carries InterCity and EuroCity long-distance passenger services, mostly from Wrocław and Opole (E 30 railway in III Pan-European corridors), Częstochowa, Katowice, Kraków to Warsaw.

This is currently the highest speed of any regularly scheduled passenger train in Poland.

History 
The CMK was constructed between 1971 and 1977, as a freight line designed to haul coal from Upper Silesia and Zagłębie Dabrowskie to the ports of the Tricity. According to the original idea, it was supposed to start at Zawiercie, and end at Tczew or Gdańsk. However, the economic crisis in mid-1970s Poland changed these plans, and due to lack of money the CMK ends at Grodzisk Mazowiecki, where it is connected to the already-existing Warsaw–Vienna railway

The idea of the construction of a direct rail connection between Upper Silesia and Warsaw was first proposed by professor Aleksander Wasiutyński in the 1920s. He rightly noted that the Warsaw–Vienna railway, which goes to Warsaw through Zawiercie, Myszków, Częstochowa, Radomsko, Piotrków Trybunalski, Koluszki, and Skierniewice, would not be able to carry all the passenger and freight traffic between the two industrial centers of the newly created country. Wasiutyński's idea was abandoned, however, when the government constructed the Polish Coal Trunk-Line instead.

In the late 1950s Polish planners again considered the concept of Wasiutyński, but came to the conclusion that electrification of former Warsaw–Vienna railway should suffice for the increased traffic. The electrification was completed in 1957, increasing traffic volume by some 25%, but this was still not enough. In 1970 rail authorities briefly considered adding new tracks to existing lines, however, this idea was quickly abandoned and the idea of the construction of a brand new line was revived. The line was planned to be a two-track, high-speed connection, designed to carry both express passenger trains and heavy freight trains. Construction of several overpasses was planned, to avoid intersecting with roads.

Route 
Polish engineers considered several options for the route of the new connection. They differed in several aspects - from the starting point (either at Zawiercie or Łazy), to a finishing point somewhere in the extensive Warsaw rail junction. According to the original design, the CMK would merge with the Warsaw - Radom line south of the Polish capital. This was rejected because of the inadequate infrastructure of the Warsaw - Radom line and the impossibility of extending the CMK further northwards. Another idea was that the CMK would merge with the Warsaw-Vienna Railway near Piastów, but this would have been too costly because of the densely populated area. Finally, the route from Zawiercie to Grodzisk Mazowiecki was chosen.

The decision to begin construction of the  Zawiercie - Radzice connection was taken in June 1971, and the first works began in August of that year. Some 30 companies participated in the construction, and the first trains ran on the still unfinished CMK on 26 September 1974, when a single track between Zawiercie and Idzikowice was opened, together with branches to Kraków (Starzyny - Psary), Kielce (Knapówka - Czarnca), Częstochowa (Włoszczowa Północna - Żelisławice), Łódż (Idzikowice - Dąba Opoczyńska), and Radom (Idzikowice - Radzice). The CMK was finally completed on 23 December 1977, when the  connection Mszczonów - Grodzisk Mazowiecki was electrified. After completion of the track from Zawiercie to Grodzisk, construction of a Warsaw - Gdańsk Port Północny (via Wyszogród, Płock, Sierpc, Brodnica and Malbork) connection was planned, but abandoned *in the late 1970s and early 1980, due to the ongoing financial crisis in Poland.

Service 
For the first seven years, the CMK was used mostly for freight traffic. In 1980, the line carried 73 freight trains and only 4 passenger trains daily. This changed in the mid-1980s, when the government in Warsaw decided to open the line to more passenger trains. Before 2009 the Polish State Railways owned no rolling stock capable of such speeds, and numerous improvements in the infrastructure would be required. The CMK line also lacked cab signalling which is required on high-speed rail lines, where trains travel at speeds which make observation of lineside signals unreliable.

Modernization after 2009 

Delivery of the 10 locomotives was completed in June 2010.

On 29 August 2009 PKP signed a contract with Thales Rail Signalling to install European Train Control System (ETCS) Level 1 signalling on the CMK rail line, a very modern signalling system which is being installed throughout the European Union particularly on high-speed rail lines. ETCS replaces lineside signals by data transmission to an on-board computer on the train, with signal aspects, speed restrictions, and a safe braking curve displayed on a monitor in front of the driver. ETCS satisfies the requirement of cab signalling for high speed trains, while also providing greatly increased safety.

On 30 May 2011, PKP signed a contract to procure twenty Alstom Pendolino ETR 610 trains capable of a maximum speed of 250 km/h (155 mph) for delivery in 2014. The first Alstom Pendolino was delivered on 12 August 2013. Plans exist to convert the electrification of the CMK line from the present 3 kV DC to 25 kV AC, and the Pendolinos and the new Siemens ES64U4 locomotives can operate on both electrical systems.

High speed tests using the new Pendolino ED250 on the CMK were conducted in November 2013. On the first day of tests, 16 November, the Pendolino reached . On 24 November 2013 the final day of tests on the CMK the Pendolino reached .

These are moveable-frog (or 'swingnose') switches of the type used on French TGV and German high-speed rail lines, and the switches at Szeligi are the first such installation in Poland. The installation at Szeligi was carried out by the Polish subsidiary VAE Polska of the Austrian supplier Voestalpine Weichensysteme GmbH.

On 14 December 2014 Pendolino services under the name 'Express Intercity Premium' began operating on the CMK, with trains running from Kraków and Katowice to Warsaw on the CMK and continuing to Gdańsk and Gdynia.  The Pendolinos reach  on a total of 133 kilometers of the CMK, divided into two disjoint sections; the first regularly scheduled operation at 200 km/h in Poland. In addition, two daily Pendolinos run from Warsaw to Wrocław, running on the CMK part of the way to Częstochowa and continuing via Opole to Wrocław.

References

External links 
Photo gallery of the CMK
View of the rail line from the drone

See also 
Polish Coal Trunk-Line
Broad Gauge Metallurgy Line
Pendolino

Railway lines in Poland